The 1971Boston College Eagles football team represented Boston College as an independent during the 1971 NCAA University Division football season. Led by fourth-year head coach Joe Yukica, the Eagles compiled a record of 9–2, but were not invited to a bowl game. They were passed up for a spot in the Peach Bowl in favor of four-loss Georgia Tech, partly due to the Eagles' reputation of having a slow, defense-heavy style of play. Boston College played home games at Alumni Stadium in Chestnut Hill, Massachusetts.

Schedule

Game notes
The game against rival Holy Cross was moved at the last minute to the newly constructed Schaefer Stadium (home of the New England Patriots until 2001) due to a heavy snowstorm making conditions unplayable at Fitton Field in Worcester.

Personnel
RB #33 Fred Willis

References

Boston College
Boston College Eagles football seasons
Boston College Eagles football
Boston College Eagles football